Bill C-31 may refer to the following bills:
"An Act to Amend the Indian Act", a 1985 act amending the Canadian Indian Act
An Act to Amend the Canada Elections Act and the Public Service Employment Act, a 2007 act
"Protecting Canada's Immigration System Act", a 2012 act
An Act to Implement Certain Provisions of the Budget Tabled in Parliament on February 11, 2014 and Other Measures, a 2014 act including provisions on bitcoin

Canadian federal legislation